Outta My Head may refer to:

 Outta My Head (album), a 2012 album by Diandra, or the title song
 "Outta My Head" (Craig Campbell song), 2012
 "Outta My Head" (Daughtry song), 2012
 "Outta My Head" (Leona Lewis song), 2009
 "Outta My Head" (Spiderbait song), 2001
 "Outta My Head (Ay Ya Ya)", a 2007 song by Ashlee Simpson
 "Outta My Head", a 2010 song by Darren Styles from Feel the Pressure
 "Outta My Head", a 2019 song by Khalid and John Mayer from Free Spirit

See also
 Out of My Head (disambiguation)